The 2008 LKL Finals was the championship series of the Lithuanian Basketball League's 2007–08 LKL season, and the conclusion of the season's playoffs. Žalgiris defeated Lietuvos Rytas in a five games, series 4–1. It was the club's 12th Lithuanian League title. Žalgiris had won the most Lithuanian championships of all-time at that point. Lietuvos Rytas had three Lithuanian championships at that time.  The games were broadcast on LTV with Linas Kunigėlis as the announcer.

Way to Finals 
On the way to the finals, Žalgiris won against Sakalai (110–73, 90–80), in the quarterfinals, and Šiauliai (100–76, 94–83), in the semifinals. Šiauliai later won third place.
Lietuvos Rytas defeated Aisčiai-Atletas (126–59, 87–67), in the first round of the playoffs, and later Alytus (116–62, 115–85).

Game summaries

Game 1

Game 2

Game 3

Game 4

Game 5

External links
Official Lithuanian Basketball League (LKL) website
Official website of BC Lietuvos Rytas 
Official website of Žalgiris

Lietuvos krepšinio lyga Finals
Final